Leela is a name of Sanskrit origin. Like many Sanskrit words, it cannot be literally translated to English but can be loosely translated as "play" (noun). Lila is common to both non-dualistic and dualistic philosophical schools, but has a markedly different significance in each. Within non-dualism, Leela is a way of describing all reality, including the cosmos, as the outcome of creative play by the divine absolute (Brahman). It was also used to mean "Princess of Darkness" in some regions of the world.

Given name
 Leela Aheer (born 1970), Canadian politician
 Leela Bunce (born 1980), British media personality
 Leela Chitnis (1912–2003), Indian actress
 Leela Corman, American cartoonist
 Leela Desai (fl. 1937–1961), Indian actress
 Leela Devi (1932–1998), Indian writer
 Leela Devi Dookhun (born 1961), Mauritian cabinet minister
 Leela Dube (1923–2012), Indian anthropologist
 Leela Gandhi (born 1966), Indian-American academic
 Leela Gilday, Dene-Canadian singer
 Leela Grace (born 1977), American singer-songwriter
 Leela Hamid (born 1984), Maldivian volleyball player
 Leela Hazzah, Egyptian conservation biologist
 Leela James (born 1983), American singer-songwriter
 Leela Majumdar (1908–2007), Bengali writer
 Leela Damodara Menon (born 1923), Indian politician
 Leela Mishra (1908–1988), Indian actress
 Leela Naidu (1940–2009), Indian actress
 Leela Nambudiripad (1934–2021), Indian children's author
 Leela Omchery (born 1929), Indian singer and writer
 Leela Roy (1900–1970), Indian politician
 Leela Samson (born 1951), Indian dancer and writer
 Leela Savasta, Canadian actress
 Leela Soma, Indian-Scottish writer
 Leela Sumant Moolgaokar (1916–1992), Indian social worker

Surname
 Chindodi Leela (1937–2010), Indian actress and politician
 Kulappulli Leela, Indian actress
 P. Leela (1934–2005), Indian playback singer

Fictional characters
 Leela, granddaughter of Akela in Rudyard Kipling's The Jungle Book
Turanga Leela, a protagonist of Futurama
 Leela of the Sevateem, a companion of the Fourth Doctor in Doctor Who.

See also
 Leela (disambiguation)
 Death of Leelah Alcorn (1997–2014), suicide of an American transgender girl
 Lela (disambiguation)
 Leila (name)
 Lila (given name)

Indian feminine given names
Surnames of Indian origin